Mississauga East—Cooksville is a provincial electoral district in Ontario, Canada, that has been represented in the Legislative Assembly of Ontario since the 2007 provincial election.

History
The riding was created in 2003 from parts of Mississauga Centre and Mississauga East ridings. It consists of the part of the City of Mississauga east of a line drawn from north to south along the Queensway, Mavis Road, Highway 403, Central Parkway East and Burnhamthorpe Road East.

Member of Provincial Parliament

This riding has elected the following members of the Legislative Assembly of Ontario:

Election results

2007 electoral reform referendum

Sources

Elections Ontario Past Election Results
Map of riding for 2018 election

Ontario provincial electoral districts
Politics of Mississauga